Sinsing District is a downtown district of Kaohsiung City, Taiwan.

Name
Sinsing means new prosperity in Mandarin Chinese.

History
Sinsing used to be called Tāi-káng-po͘ in early days where it was filled with endless wilderness before. During the Japanese rule of Taiwan, residents in the area used to make a living from farming and lived a simple life. Due to the nature of agriculture industry, people deployed water conservation methods in the area, thus irrigation system was spread all over the area. Fields became fertile and they grew rice, sweet potato, sugarcane or corn.

After the handover of Taiwan from Japan to the Republic of China in 1945, the area grew gradually and was renamed Sinsing District.

Administrative divisions

The district consists of Haoran, Zhencheng, Desheng, Zhenhua, Zhengqi, Dezheng, Rensheng, Dewang, Huasheng, Jiaoyuan, Yongning, Yuheng, Shunchang, Wenchang, Guangyao, Xingchang, Kaiping, Chenggong, Xinjiang, Liming, Aiping, Nangang, Zhongtung, Mingzhuang, Daming, Qiushan, Zhangyi, Jianxing, Jianhua, Hanmin, Rongzhi and Tungpo Village.

Tourist attractions
 Hong Fa Temple (宏法寺)
 Liuhe Night Market
 Dingxin Park
 Hsin Chueh Chian Shopping Area
 Jhongsiao Park
 Nanhua Shopping Center
 Park Number 11
 Sinsing Park
 Old Japanese Villa逍遙園

References

External links

 

Districts of Kaohsiung